David Gardiner "Dode" Phillips III (January 2, 1900 – December 29, 1965) was an American football player and coach. He coached high school in Anderson, South Carolina and then his alma mater. He also played several years of minor league baseball before committing to coaching full-time at Moultrie High School in Georgia.  Moultrie High won the south Georgia title in 1928. Phillips worked for NBC WFBC as a sports analyst and color commentator in 1937 and 1938 before returning to the sideline as an assistant for Jakie Todd at Erskine. In 1941, Todd was appointed as chief of the state pardon and parole board. Phillips took over and coached Erskine for the final three games of the season.

In 1950, a pool of sportswriters named him the best athlete of the first half of the 20th century in South Carolina. Phillips played for the Erskine Flying Fleet of Erskine College. He was inducted to the school's sports hall of fame. Some writers picked him All-Southern in 1921. Walter Camp included him as an Honorable Mention All-American halfback in 1921. In 1965, just before his death, Phillips was selected to be admitted to the National Association of Intercollegiate Athletics (NAIA) Hall of Fame.

Head coaching record

References

External links
 

1900 births
1965 deaths
American football drop kickers
American football halfbacks
Anderson Electricians players
Erskine Flying Fleet baseball players
Erskine Flying Fleet football coaches
Erskine Flying Fleet football players
High school football coaches in Georgia (U.S. state)
High school football coaches in South Carolina
All-Southern college football players
People from Greenwood County, South Carolina
Players of American football from South Carolina